Tinnsjå, also called Tinnsjø and Tinnsjøen, is one of the largest lakes in Norway, and one of the deepest in Europe. It is located between the municipalities of Tinn and Notodden in Vestfold og Telemark county. At its source in the west, the Måna river flows out of Møsvatn and past Rjukan into Tinnsjå. From the north, the river Mår flows from the Mår, Gøystavatn, and Kalhovdfjorden lakes into Tinnsjå. Tinnsjå is part of the Skiensvassdrag, and drains via the Tinnelva river in the south, down to Heddalsvatn.

In 1944, during the German occupation of Norway, the ferry SF Hydro was sunk in Tinnsjå by the Norwegian resistance. The Germans were using the ferry to transport a large quantity of heavy water to Germany, where it was to be used for nuclear weapon research. The heavy water had been produced at Vemork, a factory located in Rjukan. 

The wreck of the ferry was discovered in 1993. In 2004, it was investigated and filmed for an episode of NOVA; heavy water samples were recovered and deuterium isotopic enrichment was confirmed.

In 2004 a film crew shooting footage for a new documentary on the heavy water sabotage became aware of an unusual fish, swimming near the lake bottom at a depth of 430 m. Two specimens of the previously unknown fish were captured in April 2005. Analysis revealed the fish to be closely related to Arctic char. The light-colored, translucent fish is up to 15 cm long and lacks a swim bladder.

References

Lakes of Vestfold og Telemark
Notodden
Tinn